Ada Shipyard (Turkish: Ada Tersanesi) is a Turkish shipyard established in Tuzla, Istanbul in 2008.

See also 

 List of shipbuilders and shipyards

References

External links 

 Ada Shipyard

Turkish companies established in 2008
Shipyards of Turkey
Shipbuilding companies of Turkey